Nestan (also Romanized as Nestān; also known as Neyestān and Nīstān) is a village in Gavork-e Sardasht Rural District, in the Central District of Sardasht County, West Azerbaijan Province, Iran. At the 2006 census, its population was 686, in 113 families.

References 

Populated places in Sardasht County